Perry Edward Smith (October 27, 1928 – April 14, 1965) was one of two career criminals convicted of murdering the four members of the Clutter family in Holcomb, Kansas, United States, on November 15, 1959, a crime that was made famous by Truman Capote in his 1966 non-fiction novel In Cold Blood. Along with Richard Hickock, Smith took part in the burglary and multiple murder at the Clutter family farmhouse.

Early life and family
Perry Edward Smith was born in Huntington, Nevada, a now-abandoned community in Elko County. His parents, Florence Julia "Flo" Buckskin and John "Tex" Smith, were rodeo performers. Sources conflict on whether Smith was of mixed Dutch and Shoshone ancestry (from his father's and mother's side, respectively) or IrishCherokee. The family moved to Juneau, Alaska in 1929, where the elder Smith distilled bootleg whisky for a living. Smith's father abused his wife and four children, and in 1935 his wife left him, taking the children with her to San Francisco, California.

Smith and his siblings were raised initially with their alcoholic mother, Flo. After Flo died from choking on her own vomit when he was 13, he and his siblings were placed in a Catholic orphanage, where nuns allegedly abused him physically and emotionally for his lifelong problem of chronic bed wetting, a result of malnutrition. He was also placed in a Salvation Army orphanage, where one of the caretakers allegedly tried to drown him. In his adolescence, Smith reunited with his father, Tex, and together they lived an itinerant existence across much of the western United States. Smith also spent time in different juvenile detention homes after joining a street gang and becoming involved in petty crime. In the mid-1960s, Tex moved to Cold Springs, Nevada, where he lived to the age of 92 before dying by suicide, distraught over poor health.

Two of Smith's siblings committed suicide as young adults, and the remaining sister eliminated any contact with him.

Military service and life in Washington
At age 16, Smith joined the United States Merchant Marine. He joined the United States Army in 1948, where he served in the Korean War. During his stint in the Army, Smith spent weeks at a time in the stockade for public carousing and fighting with Korean civilians and other soldiers. In spite of his record, Smith received an honorable discharge in 1952 and was last stationed at Fort Lewis, Washington. 

Smith stayed with an Army friend for a time in the Tacoma area, where he was employed as a car painter. With one of his first paychecks, Smith bought a motorcycle. While riding, he lost control of the bike due to adverse weather conditions. Smith nearly died in the accident and spent six months in a Bellingham hospital. Because of the severe injuries, his legs were permanently disabled and he suffered chronic leg pains for the rest of his life. To help control the pain, Smith consumed an excessive amount of aspirin.

The murders and life on death row 

Perry Smith and Richard Hickock first met in the Kansas State Penitentiary in Lansing, Kansas. Smith was eventually paroled, and the pair later resumed their acquaintance upon Hickock's release in November 1959. Hickock allegedly wrote to Smith, imploring him to violate his parole by returning to Kansas to assist Hickock with a robbery he had been planning. Smith claimed that his return was initially motivated not by meeting with Hickock, but by the chance to reunite with another former inmate, Willie-Jay, with whom he had developed an especially close bond while in prison; Smith soon discovered, however, that he had arrived in the Kansas City area just a few hours after Willie-Jay had left for the east coast.

Smith met with Hickock, and almost immediately the two set to work out Hickock's plan. Driving west to Holcomb, they entered the Clutter home through an unlocked door late in the evening of November 14, 1959, whereupon they bound, gagged, and then murdered the four family members present: Herbert Clutter and his wife Bonnie, and their children, Nancy, 16, and Kenyon, 15. Hickock later testified that he had gotten the idea to rob the Clutters after being told by former cellmate Floyd Wells, who had worked as a farmhand for the Clutters, that there was a safe in the family's house containing $10,000. When they invaded the house, however, they discovered that there was no such safe. After six weeks at large, mostly spent idly roaming the country, Smith and Hickock were captured in Las Vegas, Nevada, on December 30, 1959, following an extensive manhunt which extended into Mexico.

Smith admitted to cutting the throat of the father, Herbert Clutter, as well as shooting both Herbert and Kenyon Clutter in the head with a shotgun at close range. Records show a dispute as to which of the two shot the women, Bonnie and Nancy Clutter. Alvin Dewey, chief investigator of the Clutter family murders, testified at the trial that Hickock insisted in his confession that Smith performed all four killings; Smith, however, first confessed that Hickock killed the women, but refused to sign his confession, and later claimed to have shot them himself. Although Smith's revised confession coincided with Hickock's initial statement, both Smith and Hickock refused to testify in court, leading to a lack of an official record detailing who killed the women.

While Smith had only a grade-school education, he maintained a strong interest in art, literature and music. His rough past regarding his family and abusive childhood led him to be somewhat distant from people. He read extensively, and during his time on death row, wrote poems and painted pictures for other inmates from photos of their family members.

Relationship with Truman Capote
During research for his novel In Cold Blood, Truman Capote extensively interviewed Smith and eventually befriended him.

Execution
Smith and Hickock were executed by hanging on April 14, 1965. Smith was hanged second, dying at 1:19 a.m.

Exhumation
Nearly 50 years after the executions, the bodies of the killers were exhumed from Mount Muncie Cemetery in Lansing, as authorities hoped to solve a 53-year-old cold case using DNA. Smith and Hickock had originally been questioned about the December 19, 1959, shooting murder in Osprey, Florida of Cliff and Christine Walker and their two young children. Evidence indicated they had spent time just a few miles from the Walker crime scene after the Clutter murders. A polygraph administered at the time of their arrest cleared them of the murders, but by modern polygraph standards, their test results are no longer considered valid. On December 19, 2012, officials in Kansas exhumed the bodies of Smith and Hickock and retrieved bone fragments to compare their DNA to semen found in the pants of Christine Walker. 

In August 2013, the Sarasota County Sheriff's office announced they were unable to find a match between the DNA of Smith or Hickock and the samples in the Walker family murder. Only partial DNA could be retrieved, possibly due to degradation of the DNA samples over the decades or contamination in storage, making the outcome one of uncertainty (neither proving nor disproving the involvement of Smith and Hickock). Investigators have stated that Smith and Hickock still remain the most viable suspects.

Film portrayals
Smith was portrayed in the 1967 film version of In Cold Blood by Robert Blake, by Eric Roberts in the 1996 TV miniseries adaptation; by Clifton Collins Jr. in 2005's Capote; and by Daniel Craig in 2006's Infamous.

Song
Bastille's 2016 album Wild World includes a song entitled "Four Walls (The Ballad of Perry Smith)". The lyrics describe the imprisonment and execution of Smith. "These four walls in Holcomb" tells of how Smith has "only these four walls before they, in cold blood, hang you up".

Orville Peck's 2019 album Pony includes the song "Kansas (Remembers me Now)", written from the point of view of Perry Smith being questioned after the Clutter murders.

See also
 George York and James Latham
 Capital punishment in Kansas
 List of people executed in Kansas

References

Books

External links

1928 births
1965 deaths
20th-century executions by Kansas
20th-century executions of American people
American mass murderers
American military personnel of the Korean War
American military personnel of World War II
American murderers of children
American people of Cherokee descent
American people of Irish descent
American people convicted of murder
American sailors
Executed mass murderers
Executed people from Kansas
Executed people from Nevada
Military personnel from Nevada
People convicted of murder by Kansas
People executed by Kansas by hanging
People executed for murder
People from Elko County, Nevada
United States Army personnel of the Korean War
United States Merchant Mariners
United States Merchant Mariners of World War II
Criminal duos